Roman Yurievich Romanenko (Major, Russian Air Force; ; born 9 August 1971) is a Russian retired cosmonaut at the Yuri Gagarin Cosmonaut Training Center. He is also a politician, sitting in the State Duma since 2021 representing the Chertanovo constituency.

Personal life
Romanenko was born in Shchyolkovo, near Moscow. His parents, Yuri Victorovich Romanenko and Aleftina Ivanovna Romanenko, live in Star City. He is married to Yulia Leonidovna Romanenko (Danilovskaya). They have a son and a daughter. His hobbies include underwater hunting, tennis, car repairs, tourism, yachting, volleyball and music.

Education
After when he graduated from Star City high school in 1986, Romanenko entered the Leningrad Suvorov military school, from which he graduated in 1988. In 1988, he entered the Chernigov High Air Force School for pilots, from which he graduated in 1992 as a pilot-engineer.

Experience
Following graduation from pilot school Romanenko served as a second commander in the Air Force. He flew L-39 and Tu-134 aircraft. Romanenko has logged over 500 hours of flight time. He is a Class 3 Air Force pilot.

Awards
On 6 May 2010 Romanenko was awarded the Hero of the Russian Federation medal by the decree of the Russian President Dmitry Medvedev. He was also awarded the honorary title Pilot-Cosmonaut of the Russian Federation.

Cosmonaut career

Romanenko was selected as a cosmonaut candidate at the Gagarin Cosmonaut Training Center Cosmonaut Office in December 1997. From January 1998 to November 1999 he undertook his basic training course. In November 1999 he was qualified as a Test Cosmonaut.

He served as the backup to Oleg Kotov as the Commander of Soyuz TMA-10 and Fyodor Yurchikhin as Commander of Expedition 15.

Expedition 20/21
On 27 May 2009 Romanenko was launched into space as the commander of the Soyuz TMA-15 spacecraft from Site 1/5 at the Baikonur Cosmodrome in Kazakhstan. He was part of the Expedition 20 and Expedition 21 crews and was the third second-generation space traveller after Sergey Volkov and Richard Garriott. Romanenko served as a Flight Engineer aboard the ISS during the two long duration missions.

After spending 187 days and 20 hours in space, Romanenko returned to Earth along with astronauts, Robert Thirsk and Frank de Winne on 1 December 2009.

Expedition 34/35
On 19 December 2012, Romanenko was launched to space on Soyuz TMA-07M along with Chris Hadfield and Thomas Marshburn. He was a part of the crews of Expedition 34 and Expedition 35 aboard the ISS. He served as a Flight Engineer. 

Romanenko returned to Earth on 14 May 2013 spending 145 days and 14 hours in space.

First Spacewalk

On 19 April 2013 Romanenko completed his first spacewalk with fellow cosmonaut Pavel Vinogradov, a 6-hour 38 minute EVA to conduct repairs to the ISS.

References

External links

NASA Bio
Spacefacts biography of Roman Romanenko

1971 births
Living people
Russian cosmonauts
Crew members of the International Space Station
Heroes of the Russian Federation
Spacewalkers
Sixth convocation members of the State Duma (Russian Federation)
Seventh convocation members of the State Duma (Russian Federation)
Eighth convocation members of the State Duma (Russian Federation)